Sudden Stop is the second studio album by Canadian blues musician Colin James released in 1990 on Virgin Records. The album was recorded in Vancouver and Memphis, Tennessee.

The album features guest appearances by Bonnie Raitt, The Memphis Horns and Bobby Whitlock. "Just Came Back" went up to number 3 on North American rock stations.

Sudden Stop earned James two Juno Awards in 1991 in the Single of the Year ("Just Came Back") and Male Vocalist of the Year categories.

Commercial performance
Sudden Stop peaked at number 9 on the Canadian Albums Chart and was certified Platinum in Canada. It was the fourth-best selling Cancon album in Canada of 1990. By May 1998, the album had sold 194,430 units in Canada.

Track listing
 "Just Came Back" (Colin James, Daryl Burgess) – 4:56
 "Keep On Loving Me Baby" (Otis Rush) – 3:40
 "Show Me" (Jerry Lynn Williams) – 3:24
 "Give It Up" (Williams) – 4:03
 "Crazy Over You" (Williams) – 5:11
 "T for Trouble" (James, Bill Carter, Ruth Ellsworth) – 4:20
 "Cross My Heart (James, Carter, Ellsworth) – 3:18
 "Just One Love" (Williams, James) – 3:33
 "If You Lean on Me" (Lotti Golden, Tommy Faragher) – 4:48
 "Sudden Stop" (Bobby Russell) – 5:52

Credits
 Mastered by Greg Fulginiti

References

External links
 Sudden Stop

Colin James albums
1990 albums
Virgin Records albums